Edward Walpole was a politician.

Edward Walpole may also refer to:

Edward Walpole (died 1668) (1621–1668), English politician and knight
Edward Walpole (Jesuit) (1560–1637), an English Roman Catholic convert, who became known as a Jesuit missioner and preacher

See also 
 Walpole (surname)